Affairs is the first independent album by singer-songwriter Elliott Murphy and was reviewed by Steve Pond in Rolling Stone.

Track listing
All tracks composed by Elliott Murphy

"Talkin' About America"
"Euro-Tour"
"'Cause I Saw You"
"Cool Panic"
"Disco Sadness"
"Change Will Come"

Personnel
Elliott Murphy – vocals, guitar, harmonica, keyboards
Tony Machine – drums
Larry Russel – bass
Tommy Mandel – keyboards
Rob Alter – guitar
Ernie Brooks – bass on "Euro-Tour"
Richard Sohl – keyboards on "Euro-Tour"
Kenny Laguna – drums
Ralph Schuckett – piano
Ellen Shipley – vocals
Technical
Matthew Murphy – executive producer
Richard E. Aaron – photography

References

1980 albums
Elliott Murphy albums
Albums produced by Thom Panunzio
Albums recorded at Record Plant (New York City)